The slender antbird (Rhopornis ardesiacus) is an endangered species of bird in the family Thamnophilidae. It is monotypic within the genus Rhopornis. It is threatened by habitat loss. Both sexes are grey with black-and-white markings on the wings and red eyes. The male has a black throat, while the female has a white throat and a brown crown.

References

BirdLife Species Factsheet.

slender antbird
Birds of the Atlantic Forest
Endemic birds of Brazil
slender antbird
Taxonomy articles created by Polbot